Friedrich Wilhelm Eckhardt (25 February 1892 – 9 April 1961) was a German engineer and head of the design office for the Berliner Maschinenbau Aktien Gesellschaft vormals L. Schwartzkopff.

Life 

Friedrich Wilhelm Eckhardt was born on 25 February 1892 in Kassel and initially worked for Henschel & Sohn before switching to L. Schwartzkopff in 1916. In 1936 he became a senior engineer (Oberingenieur).

He played a decisive role in the designs of the DRG Class 41 and Class 84 steam locomotives. For the latter, he developed the Schwartzkopff-Eckhardt II bogie named after him, which was designed to improve the curve running of steam engines.

In addition he published several books on the construction and design of steam locomotives.
He died on 9 April 1961 in Niederlehme.

Works 
Die Konstruktion der Dampflokomotive and ihre Berechnung, Verlag Technik 1952, Reprint: Transpress, Stuttgart 2008, 
Lokomotivkunde. H. 5. Das Fahrgestell der Dampflokomotiven, Fachbuchverlag Leipzig, 1957
Einführung in die Theorie der Dampflokomotive für Praktiker zum Selbstunterricht, Fachbuchverlag Leipzig, 1952
Das Entwerfen von Dampflokomotiven, Siemens, 1948
Das Fahrgestell der Dampflokomotiven, Transpress, Berlin 1960

See also 
 List of railway pioneers

Sources 
 :de:Friedrich Wilhelm Eckhardt

1892 births
1961 deaths
Engineers from Kassel
People from Hesse-Nassau
German railway pioneers
German railway mechanical engineers